The Kamenka is a small river in Novosibirsk Oblast, Russia. Its length is 25 km (16 mi), with a drainage basin of 130 square kilometres.

The river rises in the swamp near Leninsky Settlement and runs southwest through the following settlements: Vitaminka, Sovetsky, Voskhod and Kamenka Village, then flows through the Dzerzhinsky, Tsentralny and Oktyabrsky city districts of Novosibirsk.

Gallery

See also
 2nd Yeltsovka River
 Yeltsovka River (lower tributary of Ob River)

References

External links
 Каменка за пазухой. НГС.НОВОСТИ.
 Город пустил корни. НГС.НОВОСТИ.

Rivers of Novosibirsk
Rivers of Novosibirsk Oblast